Deborah L. Nelson (born 14 December 1962) is an American academic.

Nelson earned her doctorate from the City University of New York and joined the University of Chicago faculty in 1996. She was appointed the Helen B. and Frank L. Sulzberger Professor of English in 2018. Her 2017 book, Tough Enough: Arbus, Arendt, Didion, McCarthy, Sontag, Weil won the  2018 James Russell Lowell Prize awarded by the Modern Language Association, and the 2019 Gordon J. Laing Award.

References

1962 births
Living people
20th-century American women writers
21st-century American women writers
University of Chicago faculty
City University of New York alumni
American women academics